is a Japanese football player currently playing for Renofa Yamaguchi FC.

Club statistics
Updated to end of 2018 season.

References

External links
Profile at Renofa Yamaguchi
 Profile at Kyoto Sanga

1984 births
Living people
Juntendo University alumni
Association football people from Mie Prefecture
Japanese footballers
J1 League players
J2 League players
Montedio Yamagata players
JEF United Chiba players
Kyoto Sanga FC players
Renofa Yamaguchi FC players
Association football midfielders